The mixed 50 metre running target was a shooting sports event held as part of the Shooting at the 1976 Summer Olympics programme. It was the second appearance of the event. The competition was held on 22 to 23 July 1976 at the shooting ranges in Montreal. 27 shooters from 16 nations competed.

Results

References

Shooting at the 1976 Summer Olympics